Diann is a feminine given name and may refer to:

Diann Blakely (born 1957), American poet, essayist, and reviewer
Diann Burns (born 1956), the first African-American woman to anchor the prime time news in Chicago
Diann Roffe (born 1967), American alpine skier, Olympic Gold Medallist at the 1994 Lillehammer Olympics
Diann Shipione, former trustee of the San Diego, California City Employees' Retirement System pension board

See also
Dian (disambiguation)
Dianne (disambiguation)